Jodhpur Group-Malani Igneous Suite Contact of Aravalli range is a geological feature representing the last phase of igneous activity of Precambrian age in the Indian Subcontinent at the foot of the picturesque Mehrangarh Fort in Jodhpur city, the second largest city in Rajasthan after Jaipur.

The uniqueness of the geological feature at Jodhpur prompted the Geological Survey of India (GSI) to declare the site as a National Geological Monument.

Etymology
Malani was the name of a district in the former state of Marwar (Jodhpur) where volcanic rocks were found and thus named as Malani beds (1877). This name underwent several changes over the years, known as Malani Volcanics Series (1902), Malani System (1933), the Malani Granite and Volcanic Suite(1968). Finally, the complete magmatic sequence has been named as the Malani Igneous Suite. The igneous suite marks the last phase of igneous activity of Precambrian age in the Indian subcontinent.

Topography and geography

Malani Igneous Suite, an integral component of the Thar Desert in Rajasthan, extends at the periphery of the desert, to an area of  covering parts of Pali, Sirohi, Jodhpur, Barmer, Jaisalmer, Jalore and Siwana districts  of western Rajasthan. In particular, a rhyolite rock exposure in a hillock of  height, originally called the "Mountain of Birds", forms the foundation for the imposing Mehrangarh Fort in Jodhpur.
The climate here is of extreme desert condition of scorching summer with hot dry winds and arid conditions. The winters are quite chilly. The rainfall is scanty and occurs during late June to September. The average rainfall is reported to be ; extremely variable with a minimum recorded of  during the famine year of 1899 and a maximum of  during the floods of 1917.

Geology

The lithological formations of the region classified as upper and lower Vindhyans in the east and Marwar in the west, have been recorded as consisting of a thick series of sedimentary rocks comprising sandstone, limestone and shales. Igneous activity preceded the deposition of these rocks in western Rajasthan in the form of a thick pile of lava, mostly of an acidic nature.  These lava and its plutonic equivalent have been noted in the form of granite bosses and sills in Jalor, Siwana, Mokalsar and Jodhpur areas and designated as Erinpura granite and Malani Igneous Suite (pictured).

Mehrangarh Fort section in Jodhpur exposes the best Jodhpur Malani Suite contact. This erosional contact is between the underlying youngest Igneous suite of rocks of Precambrian age and overlying oldest sedimentary sequence of late Proterozoic to Eocene age. Its geological significance led to it being declared a National Geological Monument.

The igneous cycle has three phases namely, the volcanic, plutonic and hypabyssal. The eruption is reported to be of fissure type.

Sandstones of Jodhpur Group form the basal part of the Marwar Supergroup and the upper boundary of these volcanics is considerably eroded. The two formations called the Sonia Formation (sandstones) and the Girbhakar Formation (sandstones) occur unconformably over the eroded surface of Malani Volcanic rocks  at the top, which comprise the Pokhran Boulder Bed (developed locally around Pokhran) with the Jodhpur Group as the basal part. The sandstones are creamy (reddish maroon upwards), and widely used as building stones.
Further classification of the Malani Igneous Suite has been done by Bhushan (1991) as Granite Plutons (at least 15 varieties including the Jodhpur Rhyolites), the Siwana Granites (several plutons covering an area of  within the Malani Igneous Suite) and the Jalore Granite (covers an area of  including  of Sankara pluton).

Geological age 
The geological age of the Malani Igneous Suite assessed by several geologists vary. Crawford and Compston (1970) assessed the age by Rb-Sr classification as 745 ± 10 Ma. They also reported, in 1975, that the Isochron age was 735 Ma which was less than the age of 840 Ma for Sandra Granite, 830 Ma for Erinpara Granites and 820 Ma for the Pali Granites. But the Geological Survey of India in its publication National Geological Monuments (2001) has given the age as 600±70 Ma.

Geodynamic significance of Malani Magmatism 
The 732 million years old anorogenic, A-type magmatism of North-Western Indian shield is characterized by volcano plutonic ring structures and owes its origin to mantle plume. This magmatism has great geodynamic significance in the configuration of the Malani Supercontinent comprising trans-Aravalli block of North-Western Indian shield, Arabian-Nubian shield sessions, Madagascar, South China, Tarim, Mongolia and Siberia.

Legend

The lone human occupant of the hill before the Mehrangarh Fort was built, was an old hermit named Cheeria Nathji, the Lord of the Birds. The hill and now the fort is habitat to thousands of birds, particularly the Cheel or Kite, the sacred bird of the Rathores. When Maharana Jodha wanted to build a fort on top of this hill, the irate hermit cursed him for intruding into his solitary cave; the curse "Jodha! May your citadel ever suffer a scarcity of water!", is true to this day as there is no water on the hill. The King, while continuing to build his fort, also appeased the hermit by building a temple and a pond for the hermit to reside and meditate.

Another folk legend about the formation of the Thar Desert region, with the Malani Igneous Suit as an integral component, is of Lord Rama, the hero of the Hindu epic Ramayana. In order to rescue his wife Sita, who was abducted by the demon–king Ravana, he attempted to cross the ocean but was turned back by the Sea–God. In a fit of fury, he raised his arrow to empty the ocean and force the Lord of the Sea to retreat, but discharged the arrow into another body of water located in western Rajasthan that resulted in its drying up. This is the area known as Marwar (former Jodhpur State) or Marusthali (desert region) or the land of the dead.

Access
The Geological monument is located in the heart of Jodhpur city, at the Mehrangarh fort hill range, which is connected by road, rail and air with the rest of the country. It is  SW of Jaipur. by the State Highway. The Northern Railway Main Line and Northern Railway Phalodi Branch passes through Jodhpur Town.

Gallery

References

Jodhpur district
Geology of Rajasthan
Proterozoic
National Geological Monuments in India